Caleb Gibbs (1748–1818) was the first commander of the Commander-in-Chief's Guard, the unit that protected General George Washington during the American Revolutionary War.

Biography
Gibbs was born on February 28, 1748, in Newport, Rhode Island. He took up residence in Marblehead, Massachusetts. 

During the American Revolutionary War, Gibbs was appointed as the adjutant of the 14th Continental Regiment, commanded by Colonel John Glover of Marblehead, on January 1, 1776. On 12 March 1776, General Washington appointed Captain Gibbs as the commander of the Commander-in-Chief's Guard, with the title of captain commandant. Three years later, in 1779, Gibbs was succeeded as commander by William Colfax. During his command of Washington's "Life Guard" Gibbs was promoted to the rank of Major on July 29, 1778. Gibbs was succeeded by William Colfax as commander of the Life Guard.

On January 1, 1781 Gibbs was reassigned to the 2nd Massachusetts Regiment.  On October 14, 1781 he fought at the Battle of Yorktown where he was wounded in action.  Gibbs was brevetted to the rank of lieutenant colonel on September 30, 1783.

In November 1783, following the British evacuation of New York, the 2nd Massachusetts was disbanded.  Gibbs was retained in Jackson's Continental Regiment, commanded by Colonel Henry Jackson, the only infantry regiment remaining in the Continental Army.  Gibbs was discharged from the Continental Army on June 20, 1784 when Jackson's Regiment was disbanded. 

In 1783 Gibbs became an Original Member of the Massachusetts Society of the Cincinnati.

In January 1787 Gibbs married Catherine Hall, the daughter of James Hall of Boston.  They had a daughter named Catherine N. Gibbs who married Mr. J. C. Park.

In 1798 Gibbs was recommended by then retired Major General Henry Knox to command a regiment when the U.S. Army was expanded during the Quasi War with France.  Knox said of Gibbs - "No officer of the late American army would discipline and command a regiment with greater effect."

On November 6, 1818, Gibbs died in Charlestown, Massachusetts.

References

Letters between Caleb Gibbs and General Washington
http://www.consource.org/index.asp?bid=582&fid=600&documentid=61817
http://www.consource.org/index.asp?bid=582&fid=600&documentid=61838
http://www.consource.org/index.asp?bid=582&fid=600&documentid=61841

External links

 http://www.revolutionarywararchives.org/gibbs.html
 http://www.newenglandancestors.org/database_search/msc.asp?f=RESEARCH\DATABASE\MSC\CONTENT\CALEB+GIBBS.HTM
 http://www.sar.org/committee/colorguard/Insignia.html

1748 births
1818 deaths
Continental Army officers from Massachusetts
People from Marblehead, Massachusetts
Aides-de-camp of George Washington
People from Newport, Rhode Island
People of colonial Rhode Island